Donald J. Summers (March 24, 1951 – March 3, 2021) was a particle physicist who worked on experiments at several labs, including Fermilab, CERN, SLAC, and KEK.

Education 
Summers received his undergraduate degree from the University of California, Santa Cruz. He completed his PhD from the University of California, Santa Barbara in 1984, where his PhD advisor was Rollin John Morrison. While he was a graduate student, Summers worked on Fermilab's experiment E-516, a pioneering study of charmed particles, which are hadron particles containing one or more charm quarks. He helped with the design, construction, and reconstruction program for the experiment's SLIC (segmented liquid ionization calorimeter) and assisted Michael Witherell with data analysis for this experiment.

Career 
After completing his PhD, Summers held a postdoctoral position with the University of Wisconsin, Madison at CERN from 1984 to 1987, where he worked on UA1, the experiment that had discovered the W and Z bosons. He held another postdoctoral position at Fermilab from 1987 to 1989. He was a professor at the University of Mississippi from 1989 until his death in 2021. During this time, he also worked on the Compact Muon Solenoid Experiment at CERN, the BaBar Experiment at SLAC, the Belle II Experiment at KEK, and the Deep Underground Neutrino Experiment at Fermilab, among others.

References

External links 

 Donald J. Summers author profile at INSPIRE-HEP

Particle physicists
20th-century American physicists
21st-century American physicists
University of California, Santa Barbara alumni
University of California, Santa Cruz alumni
People associated with CERN
1951 births
2021 deaths